Bordelais is a French term meaning "of Bordeaux" and can refer to
 an inhabitant of the city Bordeaux
 the area surrounding the city Bordeaux
 an inhabitant of the commune Les Bordes-sur-Lez
 Bordeaux wine, or the Bordeaux wine region
 Stade Bordelais, a rugby union club in Bordeaux
 Bordelaise sauce, a sauce prepared with red wine
 Bordelais cattle, distinctive black-and-white dairy cows, all but extinct today
 Baroque (grape), a French wine grape also known as Bordelais
 Bordelais (grape), another name for the French wine grape Folle blanche
 Graciano, a Spanish wine grape that is also known as Bordelais

Bordeaux